Alice Molland (died 1684) was an English woman who was executed for witchcraft. 

Her trial is poorly documented. 

She was executed by hanging in Exeter. 

She has been referred to as the last person confirmed to be executed for witchcraft in England.

A memorial plaque have been made over her.

See also
 Joan Peterson
 Jane Dodson

References

17th-century English people
Witch trials in England
People executed for witchcraft
1684 deaths
17th-century executions by England